Bartonville can refer to:

Bartonville, Texas
Bartonville, Illinois
Bartonville, Missouri